Malia Manuel (born August 9, 1993) is an American surfer. She won Rookie of the Year in 2012 and was ranked 5th on the 2014 ASP World Tour. In 2008, at the age of 14 she became the youngest surfer ever to win the U.S. Open of Surfing.

Surfing Career Highlights

 2019 - 2nd Rip Curl Pro Bells Beach
 2019 - 3rd Boost Mobile Pro Gold Coast
 2018 – 2nd Beachwaver Maui Pro
2017 - 1st Australian Open of Surfing (Manly, New South Wales)
 2016 – 2nd Van’s US Open
 2014 – Ranked 5th on the World Surf League Tour
 2014 – WQS 6star, Merewether Surf Fest Champion
 2013 – ASP World Rankings Champion
 2013 – WQS 6star, SuperGirl Pro Champ
 2012 – ASP Women’s Rookie of The Year
 2011 – Top Qualifier for the Elite ASP Women’s World Tour
 2011 – WQS 6star, Azores Islands Champion
 2011 – WQS 6star, Pantin Spain Champion
 2011 – Cover of TransWorld Surf Magazine (2nd female ever)
 2010 – Hawaii World Team member
 2009 – Hawaii World Team member
 2009 – US Open Junior Women's Champ
 2009 – Junior Women Regional Champ
 2009 – VQS Champion
 2008 – Youngest US Open Champ
 2008 – International Grom Search Champ
 2008 – Junior Women Regional Champ
 2008 – Hawaii World Team Member
 2008 – NSSA National champ Explorer Womens
 2007 – NSSA Middle School girls National Champion
 2006 – NSSA Open Women runner up
 2005 – Hawaii World Team member
 2004 – Surfing America Champion National Title

Modeling
Manuel has been sponsored by several brands and appeared in advertisements and photo shoots. She made her debut in the Sports Illustrated swimsuit issue in 2020.

References

External links
 Profile in World Surf League

1993 births
Living people
American surfers
People from Kauai
American female surfers
Female models from Hawaii
21st-century American women